Ninos Nikolaidis is a Greek rower from Volos. Among with Ioannis Marokos, he won a silver medal for Greece, at the 2018 Mediterranean Games.

References

Living people
1998 births
Mediterranean Games silver medalists for Greece
Greek male rowers
Mediterranean Games medalists in rowing
Competitors at the 2018 Mediterranean Games
Sportspeople from Volos